Rudrapur  is a constituency of Deoria covering the city of Rudrapur in the Deoria district of Uttar Pradesh, India.

Rudrapur is one of five assembly constituencies in the Bansgaon Lok Sabha constituency. Since 2008, this assembly constituency is numbered 336 amongst 403 constituencies.

Election results

2022

2017
2017 Uttar Pradesh Legislative Election was won by the Bharatiya Janta Party candidate Jai Prakash Nishad defeating Indian National Congress candidate Akhilesh Pratap Singh by a margin of 26,789 votes.

Members of Legislative Assembly

References

External links
 

Assembly constituencies of Uttar Pradesh
Deoria district